La chance de ma vie is a 2011 French comedy film directed by Nicolas Cuche.

Cast 
 Virginie Efira - Joanna Sorini
 François-Xavier Demaison - Julien Monnier
 Armelle Deutsch - Sophie
 Raphaël Personnaz - Martin Dupont
 Thomas N'Gijol - Vincent
 Brigitte Roüan - Joanna's Mother
 Marie-Christine Adam - Dominique
 Élie Semoun - Philippe Markus
 Francis Perrin - François
 Eric Godon - Doctor Py
 Jean-Louis Sbille - M. Mexès
 Tania Garbarski - Alice

See also 
 Stay Away from Me (2013)

References

External links 

2011 films
2011 romantic comedy films
French romantic comedy films
2010s French films